Yavé Cahard (born 26 December 1957) is a cyclist from  France. He competed at the 1980 Summer Olympics held in Moscow, Soviet Union in the individual sprint event where he finished in second place. Cahard also won one silver and two bronze medals in the professional sprint events at the 1982, 1983, and 1984 UCI World Track Cycling Championships.

References

1957 births
Living people
French male cyclists
Olympic cyclists of France
Olympic silver medalists for France
Cyclists at the 1980 Summer Olympics
Olympic medalists in cycling
People from Sainte-Adresse
Medalists at the 1980 Summer Olympics
Sportspeople from Seine-Maritime
Cyclists from Normandy
20th-century French people
21st-century French people